Peter Stephan Zurbriggen (27 August 1943 – 28 August 2022) was a Swiss archbishop of the Catholic Church, who worked in the diplomatic service of the Holy See from 1993 until his retirement in 2018. He was Apostolic Nunzio to Austria from 2009 to 2018.

Biography
He was born and died in Brig, Switzerland. He was ordained a priest on 10 October 1969, entering the Pontifical Ecclesiastical Academy in 1970.

On 13 November 1993, he was named Apostolic Delegate to Mozambique, advancing to the post of Apostolic Nuncio in that country on 22 February 1996.

He was elevated to the episcopacy on 6 January 1994, becoming titular archbishop of Glastonbury.

On 13 June 1998, Pope John Paul II appointed him Apostolic Nunzio to Georgia, Armenia and Azerbaijan. From 25 October 2001 he was Apostolic Nuncio to Lithuania, Latvia and Estonia. Pope John Paul II named him Apostolic Administrator of Estonia on 15 November 2001. Pope Benedict XVI named him Apostolic Nuncio to Austria on 14 January 2009.

See also
 List of heads of the diplomatic missions of the Holy See

References

1943 births
2022 deaths
Roman Catholic archbishops in Austria
Apostolic Nuncios to Mozambique
Apostolic Nuncios to Georgia (country)
Apostolic Nuncios to Azerbaijan
Apostolic Nuncios to Armenia
Apostolic Nuncios to Estonia
Apostolic Nuncios to Latvia
Apostolic Nuncios to Lithuania
Apostolic Nuncios to Austria
People from Brig-Glis